Following is an incomplete list of past and present Members of Parliament (MPs) of the United Kingdom whose surnames begin with O.  The dates in parentheses are the periods for which they were MPs.

 Francis O'Beirne
Sir Bill O'Brien (1983–2005)
Cornelius O'Brien
Sir Edward O'Brien, 4th Baronet
J. F. X. O'Brien
James O'Brien
John O'Brien
Lucius O'Brien, 13th Baron Inchiquin
Mike O'Brien (1992–2010)
Patrick O'Brien
Stephen O'Brien (1999–2015)
William O'Brien
William Smith O'Brien
Charles O'Connell
Daniel O'Connell
Daniel O'Connell Jnr
John O'Connell
Maurice O'Connell
Art O'Connor
Arthur O'Connor
Feargus O'Connor
John O'Connor
John O'Connor
Morgan John O'Connell
T. P. O'Connor (1880–1929)
James Edward O'Doherty
Joseph O'Doherty
Philip O'Doherty
William O'Doherty
Charles James O'Donnell (1906–1910)
John O'Donnell
Frank Hugh O'Donnell
Thomas O'Donnell
Daniel O'Donoghue
Anthony O'Flaherty
Patrick O'Keeffe
Conor O'Kelly
John J. O'Kelly
Seán T. O'Kelly
Thomas O'Hagan, 1st Baron O'Hagan
Thomas O'Hanlon
Edward O'Hara (1990–2010)
Patrick O'Hea
Brian O'Higgins
Pádraic Ó Máille
Seán O'Mahony
William O'Malley
James O'Mara
Arthur O'Neill
Charles O'Neill
Edward O'Neill, 2nd Baron O'Neill
Hugh O'Neill, 1st Baron Rathcavan
John O'Neill, 3rd Viscount O'Neill
Martin O'Neill, Baron O'Neill of Clackmannan (1979–2005)
Robert Torrens O'Neill
Daniel O'Leary
William Hagarty O'Leary
Bryan O'Loghlen
 Colman O'Loghlen
Myles O'Reilly
William O'Reilly
 William O'Shea
Patrick O'Shaughnessy
Richard O'Shaughnessy
Eugene O'Sullivan
Timothy O'Sullivan
William Henry O'Sullivan  OA
Gordon Oakes (1964–1997)
Mark Oaten (1997–2010) OD
William Odell
OG
George Ogle  OL
William Oldfield (1942–1955)
Laurence Oliphant (1865–1869)
Charles Silver Oliver
Bill Olner (1992–2010)
Sarah Olney (2016–2017) ON
Richard Onslow, 1st Baron Onslow (1679–1715)
Chi Onwurah (2010–present) OP
Lembit Öpik (1997–2010)
Sally Oppenheim-Barnes, Baroness Oppenheim-Barnes (1970–1987) OR
Diana Organ (1997–2005)
Sir Charles Ormsby, 1st Baronet
David Ormsby-Gore, 5th Baron Harlech (1950–1961)
William Ormsby-Gore
William Ormsby-Gore, 4th Baron Harlech (1910–1938)
William Ormsby-Gore, 2nd Baron Harlech (1841–1852), (1858–1876) OS
George Osborne (2001–present)
Sandra Osborne (1997–present) OT
Sir Richard Ottaway (1983–1987), (1992–2015)
Sir Arthur Otway OW
Albert Owen (2001–present)
David Owen (1966–1992)
Idris Owen (1970–1974)

 O